Morton Mintz (born January 26, 1922) is an American investigative journalist who in his early years (1946–1958) reported for two St. Louis, Missouri, newspapers, the Star-Times and the Globe-Democrat; and then, most notably The Washington Post (1958–1988). He exposed such scandals as thalidomide and the Dalkon Shield. Since 2004 he has been a Senior Adviser to Nieman Watchdog.

Career
In 1955, at the Globe-Democrat, Mintz did the nation's first newspaper series on the plight of the mentally retarded. At the Post, he broadened conventional definitions of "news" with people-oriented reporting on issues mainly involving the pharmaceutical, medical-device, tobacco, oil, auto and insurance industries.

At the Post, in 1962, Mintz broke the story of thalidomide, the sedative/tranquilizer that caused several thousand children worldwide to be born without arms, legs, or without any limbs at all. Although the press greeted the advent of the original oral contraceptive uncritically, he revealed that in approving The Pill, in 1960, the FDA had launched the greatest uncontrolled medical experiment in human history. Tens of millions of healthy human beings would take The Pill 20 or 21 days a month, often throughout their child-bearing lifespan, on the basis of inadequate scientific evidence of safety.

Mintz also reported on numerous unsafe and/or ineffective medicines and medical devices, including cholesterol-lowering MER/29, which afflicted thousands with cataracts; Oraflex, a killer anti-arthritis drug withdrawn by the manufacturer only a few months after sales began, and the Dalkon Shield and Cu-7 IUDs. Starting in 1965, and continuing into 1999, he reported on the tobacco industry, including the 1988 smoker-death trial in which cigarette makers were compelled to disclose for the first time what they knew of the dangers of smoking and when they knew it. In 1993, Mintz wrote Allies: The ACLU and the Tobacco Industry, which exposed the American Civil Liberties Union's conflict of interest in advocating a key industry cause in Congress and soliciting and accepting money from that industry, both while disclosing nothing to ACLU members of either activity.

In 1966, Mintz broke the story of the tailing of Ralph Nader by a private detective retained by General Motors and for years covered automotive-safety issues. He was often alone in reporting grave corporate crime and misconduct. Mintz covered the Supreme Court's 1965 and 1978-1980 terms. In 1983, he reported on the refusal of the United States during World War II to bomb the rail lines to the gas ovens at Birkenau and the Auschwitz death camp itself. He based the story on an exclusive interview with John J. McCloy, who as an assistant Secretary of War had played a key role in the episode.

Personal life
Mintz lives in Washington, D.C. He turned 100 in January 2022.

Awards
Columbia Journalism Award, Columbia University (1983)
Washington-Baltimore Newspaper Guild Award for Public Service (twice)
Playboy Foundation's Hugh M. Hefner First Amendment Award for Lifetime Achievement
Worth Bingham Memorial Award
Heywood Broun Memorial Award
Raymond Clapper Memorial Award
George Polk Memorial Award

Books

Authored (4) 
At Any Cost: Corporate Greed, Women, and the Dalkon Shield (1985)
The Pill: An Alarming Report (1970)
By Prescription Only: A report on the roles of the United States Food and Drug Administration, the American Medical Association, pharmaceutical manufacturers, and others in connection with the irrational and massive use of prescription drugs that may be worthless, injurious, or even lethal (1967). It updated:
The Therapeutic Nightmare: A report on prescription drugs, the men who make them, and the agency that controls them (1965)

Co-authored (4)
 America, Inc.: Who Owns and Operates the United States (1971), with Jerry S. Cohen
 Power, Inc. (1976), with Jerry S. Cohen
Quotations from President Ron (1987), with Margaret Mintz
''President Ron's Appointment Book (1988), with Anita Mintz

External links/References
 Morton Mintz home page:   Morton Mintz - Biography
 Career timeline: Morton Mintz - Investigating power
 Mort Wants To Know: Tompaine.com series on questions the press should but doesn't ask of federal candidates Excerpts
 Nieman Watchdog Project: Senior adviser Morton Mintz

References

St. Louis Globe-Democrat people
Living people
1922 births
Men centenarians
American centenarians